Isingoma Rukidi Mpuuga (about 1500), others call him Labongo and sometimes Mpuuga Rukidi was the first Biito King (Omukama Omubiito) of Bunyoro-Kitara Kingdom in present day western Uganda and the twin brother of Kato Kimera, the first Biito king of Muhwahwa (now Buganda) Kingdom

Early life
Isingoma Rukidi Mpuuga is the younger brother of Nyarwa Rwa-Kyomya, Twin brother of Kato Kimera Rwa-Kyomya and older brother of Kiiza Rwa-Kyomya.
The four were Chwezi brothers of Kwonga Maternity born north of the Victoria Nile in the land of Luo-speaking people known to Banyakitara as Bukidi.

Isingoma (father/bearer of the throne of twins) Rukidi (..of Bukidi/Lango) Mpuuga (the spotted/mixed skin or Brown) and his three brothers;
Kato, Nyarwa and Kiiza are sons of Omucwezi/Prince Kyomya Rwa-Isimbwa of Kitara and Lady Nyatworo daughter of Rwot Labongo a Luo (Langi) chief of the Kwonga clan.
They are therefore Banyakitara of Luo Maternity.

BIITO name
As per most African traditions, most clans are patrilineal. However, Chwezi-sired sons of a Kwonga woman were called "Biito", a very new clan in both the north and south of the Nile.
When Kyomya met Nyatworo and sired Nyarwa, their first son, their relationship was never officiated as per the traditions of the Kwonga and Bukidi people. Nyarwa was thus a bastard. He later sired twins Isingoma Mpuuga and Kato Kimera, a birth that required the performance of unique rituals but not at home of their maternal grandfather, Rwot Labongo.
It is said that the Chief then banished his daughter from his palace and build her a hut by a big tree locally known as "BIITO".
The children of the Kwonga woman and Chwezi Man from the Biito-tree home were henceforth referred to as "BIITO Children".
With their youngest brother Kiiza born, they stayed in that home until a messenger who was also a diviner helped them cross south after the collapse of the Bachwezi dynasty of the Empire of Kitara.

Ugandan royalty
Bunyoro